The Chocolate Works, also known as Terry's Chocolate Works, was the confectionery factory of Terry's of York, England. Opened in 1926, it closed in 2005 with the loss of 300 jobs, with production moved to other Kraft Foods sites in mainland Europe. Today, the site is being redeveloped as a mixed-use residential/commercial real estate development.

History

Construction
In 1923, Frank and Noel Terry joined the family business, Terry's of York. They revamped the company, launching new products, and bought a site off Bishopthorpe Road, York on which to develop a new factory. Built in an Art Deco style, the factory known as Terry's Chocolate Works included a distinct clock tower.

Production
Opened in 1927, products including the Chocolate Apple (already introduced in 1924), Terry's Chocolate Orange (1932), and Terry's All Gold (1932) were all produced onsite.

With the onset of the Second World War, part of the factory was taken over by F. Hills and Sons of Manchester, with some of Terry's staff helping with the manufacture and repair of aircraft propeller blades. The Chocolate Works continued to produce Terry's products, which were regularly included in troops' rations, and it took on the manufacture of chocolate for London firm Charbonnel & Walker.

In 1978, Terry's was acquired by Colgate-Palmolive for about £17 million. The new owners developed the Chocolate Lemon, which proved to be a failure. The company was sold again a few years later to United Biscuits for £25 million, forming the bulk of their confectionery division. By 1985, production and profits had increased substantially. A new plant was built specifically for production of the Chocolate Orange. After UB ran into financial difficulties, in 1993 they sold their entire confectionery division to Kraft Foods for £220 million, who amalgamated it with Jacobs Suchard to create Terry's Suchard.

From 2000, the company brand was changed from Terry's of York to simply Terry's, reducing the company's links to the city. Production was also scaled back, with just UK products and Terry's Chocolate Orange, Terry's All Gold and Twilight made for the international market.

Closure
In 2004, Kraft Foods decided to switch production of remaining products All Gold and Chocolate Orange to factories in Belgium, Sweden, Poland and Slovakia, and close the plant. The factory closed on 30 September 2005.

Redevelopment
Bought by developers Grantside, they consulted local people on how to develop the site, renamed The Chocolate Works. Their initial proposed development was rejected by the City of York Council. In February 2010, with the Grade II listed Time Office and Art Deco clock tower secured and scheduled for refurbishment and despite objections from the Commission for Architecture and the Built Environment, the firm was given planning permission for a £165 million mixed-use of residential, commercial and leisure. The eventual scheme is projected to create more than 2,700 new jobs in new and refurbished offices, two hotels, shops, bars, cafés and restaurants, over 250 homes, a nursery, care home and medical centre.

Redevelopment started in 2011, with removal of asbestos by trained and certified contractors, followed by demolition of non-scheduled buildings in early 2012.

In April 2013, the site was acquired by joint developers Henry Boot Developments and David Wilson Homes. Approval for a scheme to create 173 apartments was granted in June 2015.

In March 2023, following a £60,000 renovation project, the clock in the tower of the Chocolate Works began to function once again after a pause of 15 years.

References

External links

The Chocolate Works redevelopment

Grade II listed buildings in York
Manufacturing plants in England
British shadow factories
Art Deco architecture in England
Industrial buildings completed in 1926